Altamont is a village located in the town of Guilderland in Albany County, New York, United States. The village is in the western part of the town. The population was 1,720 at the 2010 census. The name means "high mountain."

History 

In colonial times, this area was part of the Manor of Rensselaerwyck, granted by the Dutch West India Company to Killian Van Rensselaer in 1630. The area was known as Hellerburgh in the early 18th century. In the early 19th century Knowersville, was established in the rural part of Albany County, just below the Helderberg Mountains. This settlement eventually became known as Altamont.

Altamont was a summer vacation spot that was reached by train. The train station which once served this formerly busy whistle stop is now the location of the Altamont Free Library. The old hotel in the town center burned down nearly a century ago. A village fair has been held annually in the local fairgrounds since 1893. The fairground is also the site of other festivals.

The village incorporated in 1890.  
Hiram Griggs (1836–1909) was the first mayor of the village of Altamont and his house was listed on the National Register of Historic Places in 2010.  Also listed on the National Register of Historic Places are the Delaware and Hudson Railroad Passenger Station, Fine Arts and Flower Building Altamont Fairground, Hayes House, and Lainhart Farm Complex and Dutch Barn.

Geography

However, there are two major streams that run through the town center, the Joriohenen and the Ostenraakie.

Demographics

As of the census of 2000, there were 1,737 people, 646 households, and 474 families residing in the village. The population density was 1,451.5 people per square mile (558.9/km2). There were 674 housing units at an average density of 563.2 per square mile (216.9/km2). The racial makeup of the village was 97.64% White, 1.09% African American, 0.12% Asian, 0.06% Pacific Islander, 0.17% from other races, and 0.92% from two or more races. Hispanic or Latino of any race were 1.04% of the population.

There were 646 households, out of which 42.6% had children under the age of 18 living with them, 60.1% were married couples living together, 11.3% had a female householder with no husband present, and 26.5% were non-families. 22.0% of all households were made up of individuals, and 11.6% had someone living alone who was 65 years of age or older. The average household size was 2.66 and the average family size was 3.14.

In the village, the population was spread out, with 30.1% under the age of 18, 5.1% from 18 to 24, 30.2% from 25 to 44, 22.3% from 45 to 64, and 12.4% who were 65 years of age or older. The median age was 38 years. For every 100 females, there were 87.8 males. For every 100 females age 18 and over, there were 87.2 males.

The median income for a household in the village was $52,500, and the median income for a family was $61,750. Males had a median income of $45,865 versus $32,721 for females. The per capita income for the village was $23,232. About 2.7% of families and 4.0% of the population were below the poverty line, including 3.5% of those under age 18 and 5.9% of those age 65 or over.

Location

See also
 List of incorporated places in New York's Capital District

References

External links

 Altamont Fair information
 The Altamont Enterprise, the local weekly newspaper.
 Village Government Website

 
Guilderland, New York
Villages in New York (state)
Villages in Albany County, New York